The Rục people are a sub-ethnic group within the Chut people.

At the end of 1959, the Ca Xeng border guards during one of their patrols, encountered Rục people living in caves in eastern Quảng Bình province. After months of approaching them, the border guards finally managed to persuade them to leave the caves and settle in Ruc Lan Valley, Thuong Hoa Commune. In 2013, after over 50 years of merging with this community, the Ruc were included on the list of the 10 least-known tribes of the world.

Since then, as of 2006, the government has made many attempts to relocate them (at least 93 households, 414 people).

They conduct shamanistic rituals that are said to allow them to control animals and to have caused harm to a person at one point.

See also
Arem people

References

Vietic peoples
Ethnic groups in Vietnam
Uncontacted peoples